Hollie Dodd (born 26 July 2003) is an England international rugby league player.

Dodd previously played for Castleford Tigers making her debut in the final of the 2019 Women's Challenge Cup on 27 July 2019. The match was the day after her 16th birthday and made Dodd the youngest player, female or male, to appear in a Challenge Cup final.  The same season, Castleford won the Super League league leader's shield and went on to reach the Super League grand final only to have the disappointment of losing to Leeds again, with Dodd playing at second-row.

With the 2020 season abandoned due to the Covid-19 pandemic, it was not until 2021 that Dodd's career continued. Playing for Castleford she helps the team to finish the Super League season in fifth place and to reach the play-off semi-finals. A second England appearance was made in October against .

In December 2021 Dodd left Castleford to join York. During the 2022 season Dodd was part of the York side that won the league leader's shield and reach the grand final. Dodd played in the grand final where the team lost to Leeds Rhinos.  Two further England caps were won, in the mid-season internationals against Wales and France, with Dodd scoring a try in each.

Dodd was named the Super League Young Player of the Year at the end of season awards in September 2022.  

The same month Dodd was named in the England squad for the World Cup.

References

2003 births
Living people
Castleford Tigers Women players
England women's national rugby league team players
English female rugby league players
Rugby league second-rows
Rugby league centres
York Valkyrie players